San Miguel Sigüilá is a municipality in the Quetzaltenango department of Guatemala.

Municipalities of the Quetzaltenango Department